Chan Wai Ki (born 4 May 1973) is a snooker player from Hong Kong, China who won two silver medals at the 2006 Asian Games in the doubles and team competitions. Earlier in 2006 he had become the first player to score a maximum 147 break in a tournament in Malaysia.

References

Living people
1973 births
Hong Kong snooker players
Asian Games medalists in cue sports
Cue sports players at the 2006 Asian Games

Asian Games silver medalists for Hong Kong
Medalists at the 2006 Asian Games